5-Hydroxyuracil is an oxidized form of cytosine that is produced by the oxidative deamination of cytosines by reactive oxygen species. It does not distort the DNA molecule and is bypassed by replicative DNA polymerases. It can miscode for adenine and is potentially mutagenic.

References

Nucleobases
Pyrimidines